A gubernatorial election was held on 5 April 1947 and 16 April 1947 to elect the Governor of Hokkaido Prefecture. Toshibumi Tanaka defeated Eiji Arima after a six-candidate primary to become the prefecture's first democratically elected governor.

Candidates
Toshibumi Tanaka – Chairman of the Hokkaido Government Employee Union, age 35.
 – member of the House of Representatives, age 65.
 – member of the House of Representatives, age 64.
 – member of the House of Representatives, age 45.
, age 46, represented the 
, age 53.

Results

Primary

Election

References

Hokkaido gubernational elections
1947 elections in Japan